Golsteyn is a surname. Notable people with the surname include:

Jerry Golsteyn (born 1954), American football player
Mathew L. Golsteyn, United States Army officer